Leading Lizzie Astray is a 1914 American short comedy film directed by and starring Fatty Arbuckle.

Cast
 Roscoe 'Fatty' Arbuckle as A Farm Boy
 Minta Durfee as Lizzie, the Farm Boy's Fiancée
 Ed Brady as A City Slicker
 Mack Swain as In from the Mines
 Edgar Kennedy as The Slicker's Chauffeur
 Phyllis Allen as Amorous Cafe Patron
 Charley Chase as Cafe Patron
 Al St. John as Cafe Patron
 Slim Summerville as Cafe Patron
 Leo White as Cafe Patron
 Jess Dandy as Cafe Patron (uncredited)
 Frank Hayes as Monocled Cafe Patron (uncredited)

See also
 List of American films of 1914
 Fatty Arbuckle filmography

External links
 
 Leading Lizzie on YouTube
 

1914 films
1914 comedy films
1914 short films
Silent American comedy films
American silent short films
American black-and-white films
Films directed by Roscoe Arbuckle
American comedy short films
Mutual Film films
1910s American films